The Ramanujan Journal is a peer-reviewed scientific journal covering all areas of mathematics, especially those influenced by the Indian mathematician Srinivasa Ramanujan. The journal was established in 1997 and is published by Springer Science+Business Media. According to the Journal Citation Reports, the journal has a 2021 impact factor of 0.804.

References

External links

English-language journals
Mathematics journals
Springer Science+Business Media academic journals
Publications established in 1997
9 times per year journals
Srinivasa Ramanujan